Chha-e Chhuti (2009) is an Indian Bengali Comedy drama film directed by Aniket Chattopadhyay.

Plot 
A technician's accidental death leads to a workers' union's strike for a week. Few television actors with their director go to a trip to an outcast sea side to spend the week. One senior artist Benu suggests the place with accommodation. While the team is staying there one short tempered actor Kunal slaps the caretaker Parash and he dies. All become confuse for such mishap and try to hide everything but police suspect them all.

Cast 
 Sonali Chowdhury
 Sabyasachi Chakraborty
 Kunal Mitra
 Kharaj Mukherjee 
 Rudranil Ghosh
 Anjana Basu
 Silajit Majumder
 Locket Chatterjee
 Dona Das
 Milon Roychoudhury

References

External links 
 

2009 films
Bengali-language Indian films
2000s Bengali-language films
Films directed by Aniket Chattopadhyay
Indian comedy-drama films